Jawalagera  is a village in the southern state of Karnataka, India. It is located in the Sindhnur taluk of Raichur district in Karnataka. It's postal code is 584143. The total village spans across 980 hectares with the closest town being sindhanur .

Demographics
As of 2011 Indian census, 1560 families reside in Jawalagera with a total of 8318 with 4073 males and 4245 females.

There are kingdom ruins from the Vijayanagar Empire.

See also
 Raichur
 Districts of Karnataka

References

External links
 http://Raichur.nic.in/

Villages in Raichur district